In cryptography, Yamb is a stream cypher algorithm developed by LAN Crypto. It has been submitted to the eSTREAM Project of the eCRYPT network.

External links
 Archived eSTREAM Phase 1 page for Yamb

Stream ciphers